Denis Gallagher (23 November 1922 – 3 November 2001) was an Irish Fianna Fáil politician. He served as Minister for the Gaeltacht on two occasions.

Early life
Denis Gallagher was born in Currane, by Clew Bay, facing Achill Island, County Mayo in 1922, the son of John Gallagher, a merchant, and his wife Catherine (née Gallagher). He grew up speaking English and Irish. He was educated locally and at Coláiste Éinde in Salthill. He qualified as a national school teacher having graduated from St Patrick's College in Drumcondra, Dublin. He taught in Drimnagh in Dublin for several years before returning to Mayo in 1946 to take up a teaching post. He married Hannah McHugh of Keel West, Achill in 1948, and they had twelve children.

Politics
Gallagher stood as a Clann na Poblachta candidate at the 1954 general election for Mayo North but was not elected. In the 1960s Gallagher changed allegiance and became a member of Fianna Fáil. He was elected to Mayo County Council in 1967 and was elected to Dáil Éireann on his third attempt at the 1973 general election for the Mayo West constituency. In 1974, he was appointed Fianna Fáil spokesperson on Fisheries. Fianna Fáil won the 1977 general election and Jack Lynch became Taoiseach. He appointed Gallagher as Minister for the Gaeltacht. He was an active minister with an interest in Irish language affairs. In the 1979 leadership contest Gallagher supported George Colley. However, Charles Haughey won the election, becoming Taoiseach, and Gallagher lost his position in cabinet. In March 1980, he was appointed as Minister of State at the Department of Industry, Commerce and Tourism He served in this role until the Fianna Fáil lost office in June 1981. His main achievement as minister was the establishment in 1979 of a new gaeltacht authority, Údarás na Gaeltachta.

Fianna Fáil returned to government in March 1982. In October 1982, following the resignations of Martin O'Donoghue and Desmond O'Malley from the cabinet, Gallagher returned as Minister for the Gaeltacht. He remained in that post until December when Fianna Fáil went into opposition.

Following the 1987 general election, Fianna Fáil returned to government. Haughey appointed himself as Minister for the Gaeltacht as well as Taoiseach, with Gallagher as Minister of State at the Department of the Gaeltacht. Gallagher retired from politics at the 1989 general election. After his retirement, he worked to advance the Irish language cause and also served as chairman of the Gaelic Athletic Association in Mayo.

References

 

 

 

 

1922 births
2001 deaths
Alumni of St Patrick's College, Dublin
Clann na Poblachta politicians
Fianna Fáil TDs
Irish schoolteachers
Members of the 20th Dáil
Members of the 21st Dáil
Members of the 22nd Dáil
Members of the 23rd Dáil
Members of the 24th Dáil
Members of the 25th Dáil
Ministers of State of the 25th Dáil
Ministers of State of the 23rd Dáil
Ministers of State of the 21st Dáil
People educated at Coláiste Éinde
Politicians from County Mayo